Guitars is a 2002 album by jazz band Aka Moon.  It was recorded in two days (August 18 and 19, 2001) at Studio Jet (Brussels, Belgium).  It is the third CD from the 11-CD box edited by De Werf.  Tracks 4, 5 and 6 are dedicated respectively to Jimi Hendrix, Jaco Pastorius and John Scofield, three great "guitarists".

Track listing
"A La Luce Di Paco - Act 1" – 5:02
"A La Luce Di Paco - Act 2" – 7:03
"A La Luce Di Paco - Act 3" – 4:20
"Jimi's Three Words" – 8:46
"The Last Call From Jaco" – 5:47
"Scofield" – 5:38
"From Influence To Innocence" – 7:09
"Bill's Dreams" – 12:06
"Yang-Yin-Yang" – 4:15
"Three Oceans" – 5:07

Personnel
 Fabrizio Cassol - alto saxophone, compositions (except on 1)
 Michel Hatzigeorgiou - bass guitar
 Stéphane Galland - drums
 Pierre Van Dormael - guitar
 Prasanna - guitar, composition (on 1)
 David Gilmore - guitar

External links
 Jazz in Belgium website

2002 albums
Aka Moon albums